The following list of Carnegie libraries in Alabama provides detailed information on United States Carnegie libraries in Alabama, where 14 public libraries were built from 14 grants (totaling $195,800) awarded by the Carnegie Corporation of New York from 1901 to 1916. In addition, academic libraries were built at 5 institutions (totaling $94,040).

Key

Public libraries

Academic libraries

Notes

References

Note: The above references, while all authoritative, are not entirely mutually consistent. Some details of this list may have been drawn from one of the references (usually Jones) without support from the others.

Alabama
Libraries
 
Libraries